Rasha Drachkovitch is an American television producer and President of 44 Blue Productions, which he co-founded with his wife, Stephanie Drachkovitch, in 1984. In that capacity, he has been the executive producer of A&E's Whalburgers, and Night Watch Animal Planet's Pit Bulls & Parolees, FS1's Pecos League, LMN's Killer Kids, and MSNBC's Lockup.

Early life
His father Milorad was a Serbian university professor and his mother was a winery manager. His paternal grandfather is Milorad Drašković and his maternal grandfather is Serbian-born painter Alex Džigurski (1911–1995), who emigrated to America in 1949.

Career
Drachkovitch was a producer at Los Angeles KABC-TV's for Eye on LA and Sports Line. He also served as director and editor for the syndicated sports series Greatest Sports Legends. Drachkovitch co-founded with his wife, Stephanie Noonan Drachkovitch, in 1984. The company launched with the nationally syndicated Bob Uecker's Wacky World of Sports, a sports blooper begun with an $20,000 investment.

References

External links
44 Blue Productions website
FilmMonthly.com interview with Rasha Drachkovitch
Mr. Media interviews Rasha Drachkovitch

American television producers
Living people
Year of birth missing (living people)
Stanford University alumni
American people of Serbian descent